Paco is a Spanish nickname for Francisco.

People with the nickname Paco include
Paco Alcácer (born 1993), Spanish footballer
Paco Arespacochaga (born 1971), Portuguese singer
Paco Cabanes Pastor (1954–2021), Valencian pilota player
Paco Calderón (born 1959), Mexican political cartoonist
Paco Craig (born 1965), American football player
Paco de Lucía (1947–2014), Spanish flamenco guitarist and composer
Paco Decina (born 1955), Italian choreographer
Francisco Estévez (born 1945), Spanish composer
Francisco Gento (born 1933), Spanish footballer
Paco Godia (1921–1990), Spanish racing driver
Paco González (born 1966), Spanish sport journalist
Paco Herrera (born 1953), Spanish footballer
Paco Ibáñez (born 1934), Spanish singer
Paco Jamandreu (1925–1995), Argentine fashion designer and actor
Paco Jémez (born 1970), Spanish footballer
Paco Lala's (born 1973), Mexican TV host
Paco León (born 1974), Spanish actor
Francisco Llorente Gento (born 1965), Spanish retired footballer
Paco López (born 1967), Spanish football manager and former player
Paco Moncayo (born 1940), mayor of Quito, Ecuador
Paco Peña (born 1942), Spanish flamenco guitarist
Paco Rabanne (1934–2023), Spanish fashion designer
Paco Rodriguez (born 1991), American baseball player
Pape Demba "Paco" Samb, Senegalese-American griot
Paco Stanley (1942–1999), Mexican television entertainer and politician
Paco Ignacio Taibo I (1924–2008), Spanish/Mexican writer and journalist
Paco Ignacio Taibo II (born 1949), Spanish/Mexican writer, academic and politician
Paco Tous (born 1964), Spanish actor

See also
Pancho
Patxi

References

Spanish-language hypocorisms
Lists of people by nickname